Khayiz (also Romanized as Khāyīz; also known as Khāvīz) is a village in Howmeh Rural District, in the Central District of Behbahan County, Khuzestan Province, Iran. At the 2006 census, its population was 153, in 31 families.

References 

Populated places in Behbahan County